Graham Idle (10 March 1950) is an English former professional rugby league footballer who played in the 1970s and 1980s.

Background
Graham Idle's birth was registered in Leeds district, West Riding of Yorkshire, England.

Playing career
Idle made a total of 740 appearances during his career between 1969 and 1993 – the fifth highest total in British rugby league history.

Championship appearances
Graham Idle played in Bradford Northern's victory in the  Championship during the 1980–81 season.

Challenge Cup Final appearances
Graham Idle played  in Wakefield Trinity's 3-12 defeat by Widnes in the 1979 Challenge Cup Final during the 1978–79 season at Wembley Stadium, London on Saturday 5 May 1979, in front of a crowd of a crowd of 94,218.

County Cup Final appearances
Graham Idle played right-, i.e. number 12, in Bradford Northern's 5-10 defeat by Castleford in the 1981 Yorkshire County Cup Final during the 1981–82 season at Headingley Rugby Stadium, Leeds on Saturday 3 October 1981, and played left-, i.e. number 11, in the 7-18 defeat by Hull F.C. in the 1982 Yorkshire County Cup Final during the 1981–82 season at Elland Road, Leeds on Saturday 2 October 1982.

BBC2 Floodlit Trophy Final appearances
Graham Idle played right-, i.e. number 12, in Bramley's 15-7 victory over Widnes in the 1973 BBC2 Floodlit Trophy Final during the 1973-74 season at Naughton Park, Widnes on Tuesday 18 December 1973.

References

External links
Graham Idle at bramleybuffs.com
Photograph "Graham Idle In Action" at rlhp.co.uk
Photograph "The 1981 squad pictured at Odsal" at rlhp.co.uk
Photograph "Northern celebrate the Championship win" at rlhp.co.uk
Photograph "1981 team v. Hull" at rlhp.co.uk
Photograph "Keith shows off his award" at rlhp.co.uk
Photograph "The Mayor shows off the Trophy" (upside-down) at rlhp.co.uk
Photograph "Rathbone offloads to Idle" at rlhp.co.uk
Photograph "Rathbone injured" at rlhp.co.uk
Photograph "Bradford Northern's Yorkshire Cup squad 1982" at rlhp.co.uk
Photograph "Northern's Cup semi final squad 1983" at rlhp.co.uk
Photograph "Peter Fox gives his pre match talk" at rlhp.co.uk

1950 births
Living people
Bradford Bulls players
Bramley RLFC players
Doncaster R.L.F.C. players
English rugby league players
Hunslet R.L.F.C. players
Liverpool City (rugby league) players
Mansfield Marksman players
Rochdale Hornets players
Rugby league locks
Rugby league players from Leeds
Rugby league second-rows
Sheffield Eagles players
Wakefield Trinity players
Yorkshire rugby league team players